Sharaf Uddin Khashru A politician in Sylhet District of Bangladesh. He was elected a member of parliament from Sylhet-6 to the Jatiya Party in the fifth Jatiya Sangsad elections held in the 1991 and in the sixth Jatiya Sangsad elections held on 15 February 1996, was elected a member of parliament from Sylhet-6 seat for the Bangladesh Nationalist Party.

Birth and early life

Political life 
Sharaf Uddin Khashru was involved in Jatiya Party politics. The MP was elected from this party of 1991 won. He joined the BNP in the 1994. He was elected a member of parliament on February 1996 for the Bangladesh Nationalist Party. After this the Progressive Democratic Party joined. He was defeated in the election of the 2008. After that he joined the Jatiya Party again.

See also 
 1991 Bangladeshi general election
 June 1996 Bangladeshi general election

References

External links 
List of 5th Parliament Members- Jatiya Sangsad  (Bangla)
List of 6th Parliament Members- Jatiya Sangsad  (Bangla)

Jatiya Party politicians
People from Golapganj Upazila
6th Jatiya Sangsad members
5th Jatiya Sangsad members